KIJI, (104.3 FM) currently as Boss 104.3 is a radio station based in the village of Tumon in the United States territory of Guam inside the La Casa de Colina building. The station format is Classic hits from the 1970s and 1980s, billed as "Classic rock Radio."

Radio station spins-off such as TenFour FM was sign-on from 2005 until 2012.

History
According to Pacific Daily News, the station signed on September 1, 2005 to provide news to Japanese tourists, who were currently staying on Guam. The station would also help Guam residents to learn Japanese language and culture. The branded station was FM104.

In late 2006, KIJI began programming a rhythmic-dance oldies format that they tout on-air as "Retro Radio" or "TenFour", which features classic party tunes from the 1970s, 1980s, and 1990s. The format proved to be a favorite with listeners, resulting in KIJI going full-time with the format.

On March 5, 2012, KIJI change as Boss 104.3, the station format as Classic rock radio.

In May 2016 KIJI switched back to classic hits.

External links
 
 PDN Article: 104 FM
 
 

IJI
Classic hits radio stations in the United States
2005 establishments in Guam
Radio stations established in 2005
Tumon, Guam